Huomenta Suomi (in English Good Morning Finland) is a Finnish breakfast television, originally broadcast on Kolmoskanava, then on MTV3. The show was launched on December 1, 1989. From January 2020 to December 2022, the show's name was Uutisaamu (in English News-morning). The program airs from 6:25 to 9:05 AM, with news and weather every half hour.

Broadcasters

Weekend presenters
 
 Antero Mertaranta
 Ira Hammermann
 Aki Linnanahde

Weather presenters

References

External links
  
 

Finnish television shows
1989 Finnish television series debuts
Kolmoskanava original programming
MTV3 original programming
Finnish non-fiction television series